Ray Reeves Gymnasium is located in the East Renton Highlands, Washington at Liberty Senior High School. Named for Ray Reeves, he was a founding member of the Liberty High School Booster Club and was a recipient of the Golden Acorn Award. Each year, a student athlete at liberty is given the Ray Reeves Booster Club Award. The gym was dedicated on June 11, 2004. With a seating capacity of over 2,000, it is one of the largest and most expensive class AAA high school gyms in the Pacific Northwest. In 1999, the gymnasium was remodeled and an adjoining building was added to create a higher seating capacity. The gym features a state of the art basketball court and wrestling floor. The Ray Reeves Gymnasium holds regional high school sporting events throughout the year.

Indoor arenas in Washington (state)
Sports venues in Washington (state)
Buildings and structures in King County, Washington